Chinsea Linda Lee (born 1 October 1996), known professionally as Shenseea, is a Jamaican dancehall recording artist. She initially gained attention after appearing on songs by Vybz Kartel, Sean Paul, and Christina Aguilera. On 2019, she signed a recording contract with Interscope Records and released the song "Blessed" featuring Tyga. 

On 2021, she was featured on Kanye West's Donda album on the songs Pure Souls with Roddy Ricch and  Ok Ok Pt 2 with Rooga. For her collaborations on West's album, Shenseea received an Album of the Year nomination as a featured artist at the 64th Grammy Awards. She also won Best Reggae Act at the 2021 MOBO Awards. In 2022, she released the single Lick featuring Megan Thee Stallion from her debut album Alpha.

Early life 
Shenseea was born in Jamaica to a Afro-Jamaican mother and a Korean-born father, from whom she is estranged.

Career 
After spending a few years as an aspiring artist, Shenseea was signed by Lemuel Samuel's music label Rockstar. She gained recognition after remixing the well-known Vybz Kartel's song "Loodi" and performing on a side stage at Reggae Sumfest in 2015. In 2017, she performed on Reggae Sumfest's main stage. As her notoriety grew, she toured internationally. In 2016, she won "Young Hot and Hype Artiste" at the Youth View Awards; Break Out Celebrity of 2016, and Collaboration of The Year for her song "Loodi" with Vybz Kartel. In addition to dancehall music she has shown skills in freestyling as a rapper. She teamed up with Sean Paul for the 2017 single "Rolling" and on the leg of his 2017 European tour.

In 2018, she was featured on Christina Aguilera's album Liberation, on the song "Right Moves". Vybz Kartel and Shenseea then collaborated on the song "Secret (Remix)" in October 2018. In 2019, she signed with Interscope records, and released the hip-hop/dancehall track "Blessed" featuring American artist Tyga, which accumulated over 58 million views on YouTube by April 2022. In January 2020, she collaborated with Jamaican record producer Rvssian on a single titled "IDKW" which also featured American rappers Swae Lee and Young Thug. That same year, Shenseea appeared on Masego's album Studying Abroad, and Major Lazer's Music is the Weapon. 

In 2021, Shenseea collaborated with Kanye West on his album Donda, appearing on the songs "Pure Souls" with Roddy Ricch and "Ok Ok Pt 2" with Rooga. She was also appeared onstage during West's Chicago event for Donda. For her collaborations on West's album, Shenseea received an Album of the Year nomination, as a featured artist, at the 2022 64th Grammy Awards, marking her first Grammy nomination. In 2021, Shenseea also signed with Wassim "Sal" Slaiby, aka Salxo, who also manages the Weeknd and Doja Cat. She won Best Reggae Act at the 2021 MOBO Awards.

On 21 January 2022, Shenseea released the song "Lick", featuring Megan Thee Stallion. The song is included on her debut album, Alpha, which was released on March 11, 2022.

Endorsements 
Alongside her singing career, she holds multiple corporate sponsorship deals with companies such as Telecom, Firm Flow, Boom and a Pepsi-Cola JA sponsorship.

Personal life
In 2015, at the age of 19, Shenseea gave birth to her son, named Rajeiro Lee, before her music career took off. In 2020, her son signed an endorsement deal for Babybop Kids Store at the age of four. 

In June 2020, Shenseea's mother died.

Discography

Studio albums

Singles

As lead artist

As featured artist

References

Jamaican reggae musicians
1996 births
Living people
Jamaican people of Korean descent
Jamaican dancehall musicians
21st-century women musicians
21st-century Jamaican women musicians